Döberitzer Heide nature reserve was created in 1997 in Dallgow-Döberitz in the German state of Brandenburg.

The former military use of this area, as a training ground and airfield, dates back to 1894.

References 

1997 establishments in Germany
Nature reserves in Brandenburg